Yoon Sung-yeul (born December 22, 1987) is a South Korean football player who plays for Seoul E-Land.

Club statistics

References

External links

 

1987 births
Living people
South Korean footballers
Association football midfielders
Association football fullbacks
South Korean expatriate footballers
FC Machida Zelvia players
Matsumoto Yamaga FC players
Seoul E-Land FC players
J2 League players
Japan Football League players
K League 2 players
South Korean expatriate sportspeople in Japan
Expatriate footballers in Japan